Superperfect may refer to:
 Superperfect group
 Superperfect number